Senné is a village and municipality in Michalovce District in the Košice Region of eastern Slovakia.

History
In historical records the village was first mentioned in 1263.

Geography
The village lies at an altitude of 101 metres and covers an area of 18.758 km².
It has a population of 751 people.

Ethnicity
The population is about 98% Slovak.

Culture
The village has a football pitch.

Infrastructure
The village has a grocery shop.

Transport
The village is serviced by regular bus lines.

The nearest railway station is at Michalovce 17 kilometres away.

See also
 List of municipalities and towns in Michalovce District
 List of municipalities and towns in Slovakia

External links
http://www.statistics.sk/mosmis/eng/run.html

Villages and municipalities in Michalovce District